Landskrone may refer to:

 Landskrone (Ahr), a hill in the Ahr Hills, Rhineland-Palatinate, Germany
 , a ferry between Nierstein and the Kornsand

See also
 Landskron (disambiguation)
 Landskrona, town in Sweden
 Lanškroun, a town in the Czech Republic